Pavel Vladimirovich Ovchinnikov (born 24 March 1998) is a Russian football player. He plays as goalkeeper for Ryazan.

Club career
He made his debut in the Russian Football National League for FC Veles Moscow on 17 October 2020 in a game against FC Chertanovo Moscow.

On 7 July 2021, Ovchinnikov signed for Noah, leaving the club on 21 December 2021.

References

External links
 Profile by Russian Football National League
 

1998 births
Footballers from Moscow
Living people
Russian footballers
Russia youth international footballers
Association football goalkeepers
PFC CSKA Moscow players
FC Veles Moscow players
FC Olimp-Dolgoprudny players
FC Noah players
Russian First League players
Russian Second League players
Armenian Premier League players
Russian expatriate footballers
Expatriate footballers in Armenia
Russian expatriate sportspeople in Armenia